Dutton Island is a small island in Suisun Bay, California. It is part of Solano County, and included within Reclamation District 2127. An 1850 survey map of the San Francisco Bay area made by Cadwalader Ringgold, 
as well as an 1854 map of the area by Henry Lange, shows an unlabeled island covering some of the area now occupied by Dutton Island.

References

Islands of the San Francisco Bay Area
Islands of Northern California
Islands of Solano County, California
Islands of Suisun Bay